Zhelyava Hill (‘Halm Zhelyava’ \'h&lm zhe-'lya-va\) is the ice-covered hill of elevation 237 m in the north part of Vidin Heights on Varna Peninsula, Livingston Island in the South Shetland Islands, Antarctica.  It is overlooking Williams Point to the north, Rose Valley Glacier to the southeast and Saedinenie Snowfield to the southwest.

The feature is named after the settlement of Zhelyava in western Bulgaria.

Location
Bulgarian topographic survey Tangra 2004/05. British mapping in 1968, Spanish in 1991 and Bulgarian in 2009.

Maps
 L.L. Ivanov et al. Antarctica: Livingston Island and Greenwich Island, South Shetland Islands. Scale 1:100000 topographic map. Sofia: Antarctic Place-names Commission of Bulgaria, 2005.
 L.L. Ivanov. Antarctica: Livingston Island and Greenwich, Robert, Snow and Smith Islands. Scale 1:120000 topographic map. Troyan: Manfred Wörner Foundation, 2010.  (First edition 2009. )
 Antarctic Digital Database (ADD). Scale 1:250000 topographic map of Antarctica. Scientific Committee on Antarctic Research (SCAR). Since 1993, regularly updated.
 L.L. Ivanov. Antarctica: Livingston Island and Smith Island. Scale 1:100000 topographic map. Manfred Wörner Foundation, 2017.

References
 Zhelyava Hill. SCAR Composite Antarctic Gazetteer.
 Bulgarian Antarctic Gazetteer. Antarctic Place-names Commission. (details in Bulgarian, basic data in English)

External links
 Zhelyava Hill. Copernix satellite image

Hills of Livingston Island
Bulgaria and the Antarctic